Mina, Wind of Freedom is a 1975 Spanish drama film directed by Antonio Eceiza. It was entered into the 10th Moscow International Film Festival.

Cast
 José Alonso
 Pedro Armendáriz Jr.
 Héctor Bonilla
 Sergio Corrieri
 Rosaura Revueltas
 Eslinda Núñez
 Fernando Balzaretti
 Roger Cudney as Colonel Young

References

External links
 

1977 films
1977 drama films
Mexican drama films
1970s Spanish-language films
Films directed by Antonio Eceiza
1970s Mexican films